I Want You Back is a 2022 American romantic comedy film directed by Jason Orley from a screenplay by Isaac Aptaker and Elizabeth Berger. It stars Charlie Day and Jenny Slate as two recently dumped strangers who team up to sabotage the new relationships of their exes (Gina Rodriguez and Scott Eastwood). Manny Jacinto, Clark Backo, and Mason Gooding also star.

It was digitally released on February 11, 2022, by Amazon Studios, and received generally positive reviews.

Plot

In Atlanta, thirty-somethings Peter and Emma are each dumped by their respective romantic partners: Peter's girlfriend Anne feels stifled by the complacency of their six-year relationship, and Emma's boyfriend Noah is discouraged by her lack of responsibility. Peter and Emma are both heartbroken, but after a chance meeting they become friends and try to help one another navigate their breakups. Emma confides in Peter that she considered Noah her "airplane safety mask person": the person she loved so much that she'd put on his emergency airplane oxygen mask before her own, which Peter dismisses as a silly thing to ever do. One desperate night, Emma and Peter devise a strategy to win back their exes by breaking up their new relationships: Emma will seduce Anne's new boyfriend Logan, and Peter plans to befriend Noah to convince him to breakup with his new girlfriend Ginny.

Peter gets Noah to be his personal trainer, while Emma volunteers for Logan's middle school production of Little Shop of Horrors. Peter and Emma also grow closer; he reveals his dream of opening his own nursing home and she admits her lack of ambition is due to her father's terminal illness. Peter and Noah bond, while Emma successfully impresses Logan by pretending to share his love of theatre, stunning him with a passionate performance of "Suddenly, Seymour". She also helps a troubled student, Trevor, by providing him with guidance for navigating his father's extramarital affair.

After visiting a nightclub together, Peter convinces Noah to go home and take MDMA with three girls, only to learn the girls are minors. After fleeing, Noah tells Peter he is going to propose to Ginny, to Peter's dismay. Peter breaks into Ginny and Noah's to plant fake evidence of Noah's infidelity but can't do it, and instead witnesses Noah's heartfelt proposal. Meanwhile, Emma manages to talk an eager Logan and a hesitant Anne into attempting a threesome, but Anne ultimately expresses her discomfort and leaves, having decided she wants to get back with Peter. Reconvening, Peter tells Emma of Noah's engagement and, because he is resuming his relationship with Anne, remorsefully cuts contact with Emma, who is left heartbroken.

Unbeknownst to either of them, Peter and Emma are both invited to Noah's wedding in Savannah and they bring Anne and Logan as their dates. As Peter and Emma awkwardly reconnect, she reveals that she has moved out and is studying to become a school counselor. An embarrassing encounter ensues between all, and Peter realizes Anne never believed in him, while Emma did, leading him to confess his love for her in front of everyone. Emma reveals they conspired to break up each other's new partners, but does not reciprocate feelings for Peter. Anne and Logan break up with Peter and Emma while Ginny demands they leave the wedding and Noah punches Peter. At a hotel the following morning, Peter and Anne reconcile and agree they aren't meant to be together. Emma apologizes to Noah, finally realizing they were not compatible. Peter and Emma take the same flight home, when heavy turbulence causes the oxygen masks to fall, and Peter rushes out of his seat to help Emma put her mask on first before his. As the turbulence subsides, Emma and Peter smile at one another.

Cast
 Charlie Day as Peter
 Jenny Slate as Emma
 Scott Eastwood as Noah
 Gina Rodriguez as Anne
 Manny Jacinto as Logan
 Clark Backo as Ginny
 Luke David Blumm as Trevor
 Giselle Torres as Chloe
 Isabel May as Leighton
 Quinn Cooke as Taylor
 Pete Davidson as Jase
 Jami Gertz as Rita
 Dylan Gelula as Lisa
 Mason Gooding as Paul
 Jordan Carlos as Mark
 Ben McKenzie as Leighton's Dad

Production
In February 2021, Amazon Studios announced that Jenny Slate and Charlie Day were confirmed for the lead roles; that Jason Orley would adapt a screenplay by Isaac Aptaker and Elizabeth Berger; and that Day, Adam Londy and Bart Lipton would executive-produce for The Safran Company and The Walk-Up Company. Principal photography began in March 2021 in Atlanta, Georgia. On April 16, 2021, the Savannah Regional Film Commission announced that extras were needed for four days of filming in Savannah from April 27–30. Other filming locations included the Publico restaurant and Plaza Theatre in Atlanta, and Decatur Square in Decatur.

Critical response 
 On Metacritic, the film has a weighted average score of 62 out of 100 based on 23 critics, indicating "generally favorable reviews".

Michael Phillips of Chicago Tribune gave the film 3 out of 4 stars and wrote, "I Want You Back reminds us of the value of rom-coms with actual com, not to mention performers on the order of Charlie Day and Jenny Slate.

References

External links
 

Amazon Studios films
American romantic comedy films
Films shot in Atlanta
Films shot in Savannah, Georgia
2020s English-language films
2022 romantic comedy films
Amazon Prime Video original films
2020s American films